The Goldman–Sachs family is a family of Ashkenazi Jewish descent known for the leading investment bank Goldman Sachs.  Marcus Goldman, while attending classes at the synagogue in Würzburg, met Joseph Sachs, who would become his lifelong friend. Marcus Goldman's youngest daughter, Louisa, married Samuel Sachs, the son of Joseph Sachs, fellow Lower Franconia, Bavaria immigrant. Louisa's older sister and Sam's older brother had already married. His oldest son, Julius Goldman, married Sarah Adler, daughter of Samuel Adler.  In 1882, Goldman invited his son-in-law Samuel to join him in the business and changed the firm's name to M. Goldman and Sachs.  For almost fifty years, all the partners came from the extended family.

Family tree

Marcus Goldman (1821–1904), founder of Goldman Sachs, married to Bertha Goldman 
Rebecca Goldman Dreyfuss (1851–?), married to Ludwig Dreyfuss ( 1840s–1918)
Julius Goldman (1852–1909) married to Sarah Adler Goldman, daughter of Samuel Adler (1809–1891)
Marcus Isaac Goldman (1881–1965), geologist 
Hetty Goldman (1881–1972), archaeologist
Agnes Goldman Sanborn (1887–1984), married to Ashton Sanborn (1882–1970), archaeologist
Bertha Goldman Gutmann (1879–1936), married to Bernhard Gutmann (1869-1936) American Impressionist Painter 
Rosa Goldman Sachs married to Julius Sachs (1849–1934)
 Ernest Sachs (1879–1958), physician, married to Mary Parmly Koues (1882–1973)
 Ernest Sachs, Jr. (1916–2001), neurosurgeon, married Jeanne O'Sullivan 
 Ernest Paul "Rusty" Sachs
 Ann Sachs
 Patricia Sachs
 Christopher Michael Sachs
 James Sachs
 Robert Donal Sachs
Thomas Dudley Sachs 
Louisa Goldman Sachs married to Samuel Sachs (1851–1935)
Paul J. Sachs (1878–1965), art historian, married to Meta Pollak (–1960)
Elizabeth Sachs
Celia Sachs Robinson, married to Charles A. Robinson, Jr. (1900–1965), classical scholar
Charles Alexander Robinson III
Samuel S. Robinson
Franklin W. Robinson
Marjorie Sachs
Arthur Sachs (1880–1975)
Walter E. Sachs (1884–1980), banker (partner at Goldman Sachs 1928–1959), married to Mary Williamson (1911–?; divorced 1960), actress
Katherine Russell Sachs (1943–) married Bernard Dan Steinberg June 7, 1964
Philip Williamson Sachs (1949–)
Ella Sachs Plotz (1888–1922)
Henry Goldman (1857–1937), banker, married to Babette Kaufman (1871–1954)
Florence Goldman (1891–1960), married to Edwin Chester Vogel (1884–1973)
Robert Goldman
 Henry Goldman Jr., married to Adrienne Straus Goldman
 June Breton Fisher (1927–2012), m. 1. J. Robert Breton 2. Maurice L. Fisher: author, wrote a biography on grandfather Henry Goldman (1857–1937).
 Tracy Breton, 
  Brooke Breton , 
  Cynthia Breton , 
  Taylor Breton ,
 Henry Goldman,

Note: Bernard Sachs (1858–1944), neurologist, brother of Julius and Samuel Sachs.

References

Further reading

Business families of the United States
German bankers
Jewish-American families
Jewish-German families
History of banking
Banking families